Lilla Karlsö is a small Swedish island in the Baltic Sea, situated about  off the west coast of Gotland and  from Stora Karlsö; it is part of Eksta socken. Most of the island consists of a limestone plateau. Parts of the shoreline is bordered by steep cliffs. The island is mostly covered by alvar. There is also some very old broadleaf forest, which is unique for Gotland.

The island is mostly known for its rich birdlife and flora. There are colonies of several thousands pairs of guillemot and razorbill. There are also several very rare plants for Sweden such as Lactuca quercina (called  'Karlsösallat' in Swedish), hart's-tongue fern and Petrorhagia prolifera.

Since 1954, the island has been owned by the Swedish Society for Nature Conservation and it is now a nature reserve.

See also 
Stora Karlsö
Gotland

External links 

Official website

Gotland
Swedish islands in the Baltic
Islands of Gotland County
Tourist attractions in Gotland County
Nature reserves in Sweden